Frederick W. Alt is an American geneticist. He is a member of the Immunology section of the National Academy of Sciences and a Charles A. Janeway Professor of Pediatrics, and Professor of Genetics at Harvard Medical School.  He is the Director of the Program in Cellular and Molecular Medicine at the Boston Children's Hospital. He is a Howard Hughes Medical Institute investigator, since 1987.

Career 
Alt completed his undergraduate studies at Brandeis University, graduating in 1971. He then went on to earn a Ph.D. in Biology from Stanford University in 1977 while under the research direction of Robert Schimke. He performed his postdoctoral work in David Baltimore's laboratory at Massachusetts Institute of Technology (MIT). From 1982 to 1991 he was on the faculty at Columbia University and then moved to Harvard Medical School.

Alt's research interest is in maintenance of genome stability in cells of the mammalian immunological system, particularly  antigen receptor variable region gene assembly  in developing B and T lymphocytes, immunoglobulin heavy chain class switch recombination (CSR),  and somatic hypermutation in activated mature B lymphocytes.

Personal life 
Alt is the son-in-law of the organic chemist, Koji Nakanishi, who served as Centennial Professor of Chemistry and chair of the Chemistry Department at Columbia University.

Alt is also the father of the chef and food writer, J. Kenji López-Alt.

Awards, memberships and honors
He has received many awards, this is a select list:

 Clowes Memorial Award from the American Association for Cancer Research
 Rabbi Shai Shacknai Prize from The Hebrew University
 Leukemia & Lymphoma Society de Villiers International Achievement Award
 Irvington Institute Immunology Award
 National Cancer Institute Alfred K. Knudson Award for pioneering contributions that have revolutionized the field of Cancer Genetics
 AAI-Huang Meritorious Career Award, American Association of Immunologists
 Excellence in Mentoring Award, American Association of Immunologists.
 2004 – Pasarow Foundation Prize for Extraordinary Achievement in Cancer Research
 2007 – Novartis Prize for Basic Immunology for his discoveries on B cell development and antigen responses
 2009 – William B. Coley Award for New Discoveries in Immunology from the Cancer Research Institute
 2014 – 44th annual Lewis S. Rosenstiel Award for Distinguished Work in Basic Medical Research
 2015 – Szent-Györgyi Prize for Progress in Cancer Research, from the National Foundation for Cancer Research (NFCR)
 2019 – BioLegend Herzenberg Award, for "exemplary research contributions to the field of B cell biology", American Association of Immunologists.
 2023 – Paul Ehrlich and Ludwig Darmstaedter Prize 

The Cancer Research Institute of New York gives an annual prize in his honor, the Frederick W. Alt Award for New Discoveries in Immunology.

Alt is a member of:

U.S. National Academy of Sciences
American Academy of Arts and Sciences
American Academy of Microbiology

References

External links
Official page at Harvard

American geneticists
Harvard Medical School faculty
Living people
Stanford University School of Humanities and Sciences alumni
Members of the United States National Academy of Sciences
Howard Hughes Medical Investigators
Year of birth missing (living people)
Fellows of the American Academy of Microbiology